Busted is the fifth studio album by American country music artist John Conlee. It was released in 1982 via MCA Records. The includes the singles "Busted", "Nothing Behind You, Nothing in Sight", "I Don't Remember Loving You" and "Common Man".

Track listing

Chart performance

References

1982 albums
John Conlee albums
MCA Records albums